Lady Alice Louisa Lilly Manners (born 27 April 1995) is an English columnist, fashion model and socialite.

Biography
Lady Alice is the second child of David Manners, 11th Duke of Rutland and Emma Manners, Duchess of Rutland. She attended Queen Margaret's School, York along with her two sisters, Lady Violet and Lady Eliza. She is an older sister of Charles Manners, Marquess of Granby and Lord Hugo Manners. After secondary school, Alice attended the Condé Nast College of Fashion and Design. She works as a personal shopper at Selfridges, as a stylist, and as a model. She is signed with Leni's Models agency, having posed for Bare Minerals, Matthew Williamson, and Ralph Lauren and having walked the runway for Dolce & Gabbana. She is also a writer, with her own fashion column in The Sunday Telegraph. She is a high-profile figure of the London social scene. Her involvement in English high society has led to her being featured in Tatler and Vogue. She and her sisters, known for outlandish behaviour and partying, have been dubbed "the bad-Manners girls" and "no Manners sisters" by the press.

Personal life
In 2020, Manners was reported to be the long-term partner of Otis Ferry, the son of Bryan Ferry, and to be living with him at Belvoir Castle.

References 

Living people
1995 births
Alice
Daughters of English dukes
English female models
English socialites
English columnists
English women journalists
People educated at Queen Margaret's School, York
Fashion stylists
Fashion influencers
Telegraph Media Group
British women columnists
British women bloggers
English bloggers
People from Nottingham